Dhanya Nair (born 16 July 1984) is an Indian professional badminton player.

Early life and education
Nair was born on 16 July 1984 in Palakkad, Kerala and was brought up in Pune, Maharashta. She finished her schooling from Symbiosis and graduation in Commerce from Shivray Prathishtan Maharashtra College, Pune.

Career
Nair has represented Maharashtra state in All India Badminton tournaments since 1995.

Nair’s first taste of success at the national level was in 1997, when she won the mini girls’ doubles category, at the mini national tournament in Guwahati. The following year, she won a silver medal at the school games in Patiala.

Nair dominated the 2002 season, emerging winner in the girls doubles category of ICICI Bank All India Tournament at Bangalore, the All India Junior in Thane, Sushant Chipalkatti tournament in Pune and Krishna Khaitan Memorial tournament in Chennai. She was runner-up in National Games in Hyderabad and a semi-finalist in junior nationals in Guntur. Nair won women’s doubles crown in Asian Satellite Tournament at Islamabad, Pakistan in 2004. She emerged a winner while representing Indian Railways in the World Railways Competition and repeated her performance in 2009. In the same year, she achieved a double crown, winning both the women’s singles and doubles in the Yonex Kenya International tournament at Nairobi. She was the first Indian player to achieve this feat.

In the 22nd edition of the World Championships in August 2015, Nair was a part of 18 member squad led by Saina Nehwal. In the squad, she was paired with Mohita Sahdev in the women's double category. Together they took on French players Delphine Lansac and Emilie Lefel.

Nair and Mohita Sahdev paired up in a number of tournaments in 2015, including the Thailand International Challenge, Malaysia Masters, Syed Modi International, and broke into the top 100 in the world.

Achievements

BWF International 

  BWF International Challenge tournament
  BWF International Series tournament
  BWF Future Series tournament

Awards

National Level
 March 2017 - Kolkata All India Doubles Tournament, Silver
 February 2017 - Davengere All India Doubles Tournament, Silver
 March 2016 - Valsad All India Tournament, Silver
 August 2015 - Pune All India Tournament,
Bronze
 April 2015 - Blore All India Tournament, Silver
 February 2015 - Senior Nationals Championships Vijayawada, Bronze
 December 2014 - Kochi All India Senior Tournament, Silver
November 2014 - Gandhidham All India Senior Tournament, Silver
October 2014 - Bhilwara All India Tournament, Bronze
 January 2011 - Senior Nationals Championships Rohtak, Silver in Chada Cup
 Feb 2010 - Senior Nationals Championship Guwahati, Bronze
 July 2008 - All India Major Ranking Tournament Mumbai, Women Singles & Doubles, Bronze
 Feb 2009 - Senior National Championship-Indore.Women’s Doubles, Silver

Inter-National Level
December 2015 - Qtr-finalist at the Bangladesh International Challenge 
November 2015 - Qtr-finalist at the Bahrain International Challenge 
 August 2015 - Qualified for the World Championships to be held in Jakarta, Indonesia with career best World Ranking of 68
 April 2015 - Qualified for the Singapore Super Series
January 2015 - Qtr-finalist at the Thailand International Challenge
December 2014 - Tata International Challenge Mumbai, Bronze
December 2013 - Bangladesh International Challenge, Silver
 March 2011 - Runners-up at the Uganda International Series in doubles and quarterfinalist in the singles match
 Feb 2010 - Runners-up in singles at the Iran International Challenge
 Dec 2010 - Runners-Up in doubles at the Bahrain International Tournament      
 April 2009 - Winner in both the Women Singles & Doubles events in the Yonex Kenya International, Nairobi, Kenya.
 March 2008 - Selected to represent India at the Croatian and Portuguese International
 2007 - 32nd Yonex Hungarian International Badminton Championship. Women’s Singles, Pre-quarter-finalists
 2007 - Bank of Scotland Centenary International Badminton Championships, Women’s Singles, Pre-quarter-finalists
 2005 & 2009 - Winner of World Railways
 2007 - Winner in the All India Major Ranking Tournament at Dehradun
 2004 - Winner in the Asian Satellite Tournament in Pakistan
 2002 - Bronze medallist in Junior Asian Badminton Championship, Kuala Lampur

References

External links
 

1984 births
Living people
Sportspeople from Palakkad
Racket sportspeople from Kerala
Sportswomen from Kerala
Indian female badminton players
21st-century Indian women
21st-century Indian people